HMS C11 was one of 38 C-class submarines built for the Royal Navy in the first decade of the 20th century. The boat was lost after being rammed in 1909.

Design and description
The C class was essentially a repeat of the preceding B class, albeit with better performance underwater. They displaced  on the surface and  submerged. The C-class submarines had a crew of two officers and fourteen ratings.

For surface running, the boats were powered by a single 16-cylinder  Vickers petrol engine that drove one propeller shaft. When submerged the propeller was driven by a  electric motor. They could reach  on the surface and  underwater.

The boats were armed with two 18-inch (45 cm) torpedo tubes in the bow. They could carry a pair of reload torpedoes, but generally did not as they would have to remove an equal weight of fuel in compensation.

Construction and career
C11 was built by Vickers at their Barrow-in-Furness shipyard, laid down on 6 April 1906 and was commissioned on 3 September 1907. The boat was sunk in a collision with the collier Eddystone in the North Sea south of Cromer, Norfolk on 14 July 1909. There were only three survivors. Attempts were made to salvage the stricken submarine but they were abandoned in September 1909, after only a single body had been recovered. The wreck was rediscovered in the late 1990s.

Notes

References

External links
 HMS C11 Roll of Honour
 'Submarine losses 1904 to present day' - Royal Navy Submarine Museum 

 

British C-class submarines
Ships built in Barrow-in-Furness
Shipwrecks in the North Sea
Royal Navy ship names
Maritime incidents in 1909
1907 ships
British submarine accidents
Submarines sunk in collisions